The Archaeological Museum of Aegina (Greek: Αρχαιολογικό Μουσείο Αιγίνης) is a museum in Aegina, Greece, founded on 21 October 1828 by Ioannis Kapodistrias, the first governor of independent Greece.

Exhibits
The museum contains a variety of ancient vessels, pottery, ceramics, alabasters, statuettes, inscriptions, coins, weapons and copper vessels. These objects are located in three rooms in which are all the exhibits.

One of the artifacts of the museum, an etched carnelian bead, a typical Harappan object, points to ancient trade relations with Mesopotamia and the Indus Valley civilization.

The building where the museum is housed is ground floor, equilateral, stone and tiled with a patio in the center, a wooden portico surrounds the patio and one exterior of the building.

Gallery

References

Citations

Sources

External links

www.aegina.com
Ministry of Culture and Tourism

Aegina
Museums established in 1828
1828 establishments in Greece
Ioannis Kapodistrias